Mannetjies is a given name. Notable people with the name include:

Mannetjies de Goede, South African officer
Mannetjies Roux (born 1939), South African rugby player